Patricia Bredin (born 14 February 1935) is an English actress and one-time singer, who is best known as the first representative of the United Kingdom in the Eurovision Song Contest. She took part in the 1957 contest, held in Frankfurt and finished in seventh place out of ten entries with the song "All", the first ever song sung in English at Eurovision. At 1:52, "All" was for a long time the shortest performance in the history of the contest. The record was broken in 2015 when Finland's Pertti Kurikan Nimipäivät sang "Aina mun pitää", which was only 1:27 long.

Career
Bredin took the part of Molly, the island girl, in the original cast of the musical Free as Air in 1957. In 1959, she starred in the British comedy film Left Right and Centre with Ian Carmichael. This saw British exhibitors vote her one of the most promising British new stars along with Peter Sellers and Hayley Mills. On Boxing Day in 1959 she appeared in the BBC TV's long running variety show The Good Old Days, which was rescreened on Boxing Day 2016 on BBC4 as part of the BBC's celebration of the programme.

The following year she had a leading part in another film, the period adventure The Treasure of Monte Cristo, and also starred with Sid James in Desert Mice.

Bredin succeeded Julie Andrews as Guenevere in the Broadway production of Camelot. She played the role from 16 April 1962 until she was replaced by Janet Pavek three months later.

Personal life
In 1964, Bredin married Welsh singer Ivor Emmanuel. They had no children, and divorced within two years.

She later married Canadian businessman Charles MacCulloch, but he died on their honeymoon. As Patricia Bredin-McCulloch she built up a herd of cows on their estate and looked after them for almost ten years before financial complications brought her cattle breeding to an end. She published some reminiscences about this period of her life in My Fling on the Farm (1989).

Selected filmography
 Left Right and Centre (1959) - Left - Stella Stoker
 The Bridal Path (1959) - Margaret
 Make Mine a Million (1959) - Herself, Cameo appearance
 Desert Mice (1959) - Susan
 The Treasure of Monte Cristo (1961) - Pauline
 To Have and to Hold (1963) - Lucy

References

External links

1935 births
Living people
English women singers
Eurovision Song Contest entrants for the United Kingdom
Eurovision Song Contest entrants of 1957
English women novelists
Musicians from Kingston upon Hull
Actresses from Kingston upon Hull